Hannah New (born 13 May 1984) is an English actress. She is known for her starring role on the television show Black Sails in which she plays Eleanor Guthrie, the owner of a saloon in Nassau, and also for her role as Rosalinda Fox in The Time in Between.

Early life
New was born in Balham, London, and is the youngest of three sisters. At the age of four, she attended a ballet school. She later joined the National Youth Theatre. Her interest in other cultures led her to visit over 20 countries including spending 3 months in a children's home in Bolivia in 2003.

New studied in University of Leeds where she learned Spanish, she also studied abroad in Spain and was spotted by a talent scout in Barcelona, and then studied a postgraduate degree at the Royal Central School of Speech & Drama.

Career
New's career was launched by American talent manager Stacey Castro, who discovered her in Barcelona, Spain in 2009, during a search for UK casting director Susie Figgis to find the role of "Lucrezia Borgia" for the television series The Borgias. In 2010, she was offered a role in television show The Time in Between, the adaptation of the same-titled María Dueñas novel. She played Rosalinda Fox, a young English woman who is the lover of Juan Luis Beigbeder and friend of Sira Quiroga. In 2011, she landed a lead role in "Shelter", an unaired television pilot. New featured in a Spanish movie playing alongside David Hasselhoff in the film Brain Dead 2 in 2011. 

New was managed by Castro until 2012, the year she joined the cast of the Starz TV show Black Sails. She plays Eleanor Guthrie, the daughter of Richard Guthrie, a saloon owner who runs her father's illegal businesses in Nassau. The 8-episode first season premièred on 25 January 2014, and in 2014 she was filming the second season in South Africa. New featured in all four seasons of the show which was televised until 2017. As well as acting, New found time to climb Mount Kilimanjaro for the Intyatyambo Community Project charity in 2015, and also taught English to school children in Khayelitsha during her time off from filming the TV series Black Sails.

New played Queen Leila, Princess Aurora's mother, in the Disney film Maleficent, which was released on 30 May 2014.

In 2014, New got a main role in the true-based thriller Under the Bed, in which a young woman tries to get over a recent romantic breakup while a stalker befriends her on social media and takes up residence underneath her bed. The film was released in 2017.

During 2019, New played Elizabeth Crookshank in the film Edge of the World for its 2021 release.

Filmography
Film

Television

References

External links

English film actresses
English television actresses
Actresses from London
Living people
Alumni of the Royal Central School of Speech and Drama
National Youth Theatre members
People from Balham
21st-century English actresses
1984 births